Stoic passions are various forms of emotional suffering in Stoicism, a school of Hellenistic philosophy.

Definition
The passions are transliterated pathê from Greek. The Greek word pathos was a wide-ranging term indicating an infliction one suffers. The Stoics used the word to discuss many common emotions such as anger, fear and excessive joy. A passion is a disturbing and misleading force in the mind which occurs because of a failure to reason correctly. For the Stoic Chrysippus the passions are evaluative judgements. A person experiencing such an emotion has incorrectly valued an indifferent thing. A fault of judgement, some false notion of good or evil, lies at the root of each passion. Incorrect judgement as to a present good gives rise to delight, while lust is a wrong estimate about the future. Unreal imaginings of evil cause distress about the present, or fear for the future.

These states of feeling are disturbances of mental health which upset the natural balance of the soul, and destroy its self-control. They are harmful because they conflict with right reason. The ideal Stoic would instead measure things at their real value, and see that the passions are not natural. To be free of the passions is to have a happiness which is self-contained. There would be nothing to fear—for unreason is the only evil; no cause for anger—for others cannot harm you.

Primary passions
The Stoics beginning with Zeno arranged the passions under four headings: distress, pleasure, fear and lust. One report of the Stoic definitions of these passions appears in the treatise On Passions by Pseudo-Andronicus (trans. Long & Sedley, pg. 411, modified):

 Distress (lupē) Distress is an irrational contraction, or a fresh opinion that something bad is present, at which people think it right to be depressed.
 Fear (phobos) Fear is an irrational aversion, or avoidance of an expected danger.
 Lust (epithumia) Lust is an irrational desire, or pursuit of an expected good but in reality bad.
 Delight (hēdonē) Delight is an irrational swelling, or a fresh opinion that something good is present, at which people think it right to be elated.

Two of these passions (distress and delight) refer to emotions currently present, and two of these (fear and lust) refer to emotions directed at the future. Thus there are just two states directed at the prospect of good and evil, but subdivided as to whether they are present or future:

Subdivisions

Numerous subdivisions of the same class are brought under the head of the separate passions. The definitions are those of the translation of Cicero's Tusculan Disputations by J. E. King.

Distress

 Envy  Envy is distress incurred by reason of a neighbor's prosperity.
 Rivalry  Rivalry is distress, should another be in possession of the object desired and one has to go without it oneself.
 Jealousy  Jealousy is distress arising from the fact that the thing one has coveted oneself is in the possession of the other man as well as one's own.
 Compassion  Compassion is distress arising from the wretchedness of a neighbor in undeserved suffering.
 Anxiety  Anxiety is oppressive distress.
 Mourning  Mourning is distress arising from the untimely death of a beloved object.
 Sadness  Sadness is tearful distress.
 Troubling  Troubling is burdensome distress.
 Grief  Grief is torturing distress.
 Lamenting  Distress accompanied by wailing.
 Depression  Depression is distress accompanied by brooding.
 Vexation  Vexation is lasting distress.
 Despondency  Despondency is distress without any prospect of amelioration.

Fear

 Sluggishness  Sluggishness is fear of ensuing toil.
 Shame  Shame is fear of disgrace.
 Fright  Fright is paralyzing fear which causes paleness, trembling and chattering of teeth.
 Timidity  Timidity is fear of approaching evil.
 Consternation  Consternation is fear upsetting the mental balance.
 Pusillanimity  Pusillanimity is fear following on the heels of fright like an attendant.
 Bewilderment  Bewilderment is fear paralyzing thought.
 Faintheartedness  Faintheartedness is lasting fear.

Lust

 Anger  Anger is lust of punishing the man who is thought to have inflicted an undeserved injury.
 Rage  Rage is anger springing up and suddenly showing itself.
 Hatred  Hatred is inveterate anger.
 Enmity  Enmity is anger watching as opportunity for revenge.
 Wrath  Wrath is anger of greater bitterness conceived in the innermost heart and soul.
 Greed  Greed is insatiable lust.
 Longing  Longing is lust of beholding someone who is not present.

Delight

 Malice  Malice is pleasure derived from a neighbor's evil which brings no advantage to oneself.
 Rapture  Rapture is pleasure soothing the soul by charm of the sense of hearing.
 Ostentation  Ostentation is pleasure shown in outward demeanor and puffing oneself out extravagantly.

Good feelings
The wise person (sophos) is someone who is free from the passions (apatheia). Instead the sage experiences good-feelings (eupatheia) which are clear-headed. These emotional impulses are not excessive, but nor are they diminished emotions. Instead they are the correct rational emotions. The Stoics listed the good-feelings under the headings of joy (chara), wish (boulesis), and caution (eulabeia). Thus if something is present which is a genuine good, then the wise person experiences an uplift in the soul—joy (chara). The Stoics also subdivided the good-feelings:

Joy:
Enjoyment
Cheerfulness
Good spirits

Wish:
Good intent
Goodwill
Welcoming
Cherishing
Love

Caution:
Moral shame
Reverence

See also
 On Passions
Passions

Citations

References

Andronicus, "On Passions I," Stoicorum Veterum Fragmenta, 3.391. ed. Hans von Arnim. 1903–1905.
Cicero, Marcus Tullius (1945 c. 1927). Cicero : Tusculan Disputations (Loeb Classical Library, No. 141) 2nd Ed. trans. by J. E. King. Cambridge, Massachusetts: Harvard UP.
Long, A. A., Sedley, D. N. (1987). The Hellenistic Philosophers: vol. 1. translations of the principal sources with philosophical commentary. Cambridge, England: Cambridge University Press.

External links
 The Passions according to the Classical Stoa
 The Primary Passions

Stoicism
Emotion